Tracy O'Neill is an American writer. She has written two books, The Hopeful and Quotients.

O'Neill has a BA from Connecticut College, an MFA from City College of New York, and a MA and MPhil from Columbia University. She has received the National Book Foundation 5 Under 35 Award and the Center for Fiction Emerging Writers Fellowship. O'Neill currently teaches at Vassar College.

The Hopeful 
The Hopeful was released in 2015. The novel is about a figure-skating prodigy, sixteen-year-old Alivopro Doyle, an Olympic "hopeful" who suffers an accident leaving her addicted to painkillers. Publishers Weekly said of The Hopeful: "O’Neill nevertheless offers a new spin on the sports novel, rarely relying on easy metaphors and instead using Ali’s thwarted ambition to explore other ideas of heredity, ambition, maturity, failure, and, yes, hope." Kirkus Reviews said, "the book soars in its descriptions of figure skating, capturing its strange and brutal beauty and achieving a beauty of its own in the process."

Quotients 
Quotients was released in 2020. It was seen as a 'systems' novel in the vein of Don DeLillo and David Foster Wallace. When asked by BOMB magazine  if this was the type of book she was expected to write, O'Neill said: "If the systems novel has traditionally been associated with stories told by white men, perhaps it’s because too often it’s been assumed that books by women of color centering on racialized pain, especially in the private sphere, are the sum of what women of color are capable of—when of course we have more stories to tell—rather than an inherent incompatibility between the systems novel and the requirements of representing life at the margins. I see the problem as less about this story form than a view in which our primary recommendation is construed as 'authenticity.'"In an interview with Soho Press, she said: "Being an Asian-American woman in a predominantly white society has made me attuned to the simultaneous illegibility and hypervisibility of my body, the watchedness that I mentioned is so important to the book. I have seen categories and expectations fail to contain me, just as the algorithms and dossiers fail to contain the characters in my novel."

Booklist said, "This challenging, slow-burning, yet suspenseful tale is a frame for O’Neill’s powerful and chilling warning to consider the choices we are making. With an astounding grasp of the issues confronting our age, an assured depiction of a multitude of diverse characters, and a distinctive style all her own, she ranges from movingly sensual descriptions to sharp observations, from wordplay to gut punches. In sum, this is a poignant lament for our time’s lost generation, which may be all of us." The Brooklyn Rail said, "The novel is a long, circuitous and often incredibly wordy meditation on love, life, parenthood, family, the lies we tell, technology, and the brutal machinations of global intelligence and terror."

References

Year of birth missing (living people)
Living people
American women novelists
21st-century American women writers
21st-century American novelists
American novelists of Asian descent
Place of birth missing (living people)
Connecticut College alumni
City College of New York alumni
Columbia University alumni
Vassar College faculty